FC FSA Voronezh is a Russian football club from Voronezh. It was founded as FC Fakel-StroyArt Voronezh in 2008, after the most successful team from Voronezh, FC Fakel Voronezh, was relegated into the Amateur Football League. Fakel-StroyArt advanced to the Russian Second Division in their first season. In early 2009, another Voronezh team, FC FCS-73 Voronezh, received support from the local authorities and was renamed to FC Fakel-Voronezh Voronezh. FC Fakel-StroyArt renamed themselves to FC FSA to avoid conflicts with the other Fakel. In March 2010, the club was excluded from the Second Division.

External links
Official Website

References

Association football clubs established in 2008
Association football clubs disestablished in 2010
Defunct football clubs in Russia
Sport in Voronezh
2008 establishments in Russia
2010 disestablishments in Russia